Mossaka is a town located in the Cuvette Department, Republic of the Congo.

Located on the banks of the Congo River to the west of the mouth of the Likouala-Mossaka, Mossaka is known for its large fish production.

Cuvette Department
Populated places in the Republic of the Congo